Tallusjärvi is a medium-sized lake in the Kymijoki main catchment area. It is located in the region Northern Savonia in Finland.

See also
List of lakes in Finland

References

Lakes of Kuopio
Lakes of Tervo